This is a list of state leaders in the 6th century (501–600) AD.

Africa

Africa: East

Kingdom of Aksum (complete list) –
Alla Amidas, King (f. mid 6th century)
Wazena, King (f. mid 6th century)
W`ZB, King (f. mid 6th century)
Ioel, King (f. mid 6th century)
Hataz, King (c.575)
Saifu, King (c.577)
Israel, King (c.590)
Gersem, King (c.600)

Africa: Northcentral

Vandal Kingdom (complete list) –
Thrasamund, King (496–523)
Hilderic, King (523–530)
Gelimer, King (530–534)

Americas

Americas: Mesoamerica

Maya civilization

Calakmul (complete list) –
Yuknoom Ch'een I, King (early 6th century)
Tuun K'ab' Hix, King (520–546)
Sky Witness, King (561–572)
Yax Yopaat, King (572–579)
Scroll Serpent, King (579–611)

Copán (complete list) –
B'alam Nehn, King (504–544)
Wil Ohl K'inich, King (532–551)
Sak-Lu, King (551–553)
Tzi-B'alam, King (553–578)
K'ak' Chan Yopaat, King (578–628)

Palenque (complete list) –
B'utz Aj Sak Chiik, Ajaw (487–501)
Ahkal Mo' Nahb I, Ajaw (501–524)
K'an Joy Chitam I, Ajaw (529–565)
Ahkal Mo' Nahb II, Ajaw (565–570)
Kan Bahlam I, Ajaw (572–583)
Yohl Ik'nal, Queen (583–604)

Tikal (complete list) –
Chak Tok Ich'aak II, Ajaw (c.486–508)
Lady of Tikal, Ajaw, co-ruler (511–c.527)
Kaloomte' Bahlam, Ajaw, co-ruler (c.511–527)
Bird Claw, Ajaw (early 6th century)
Wak Chan K'awiil, Ajaw (c.537–c.562)
Animal Skull, Ajaw (post-562–c.593)

Asia

Asia: Central

Hephthalite Empire – 
Toramana, Tegin (c.490–515)
Mihirakula, Tegin (c.502–530)

Rouran Khaganate (complete list) –
Yujiulü Nagai, Khan (492–506)
Yujiulü Futu, Khan (506–508)
Yujiulü Chounu, Khan (508–520)
Yujiulü Anagui, Khan (520–552)
Yujiulü Poluomen, Khan (521–524)
Yujiulü Tiefa, Khan (552–553)
Yujiulü Dengzhu, Khan (553)
Yujiulü Kangti, Khan (553)
Yujiulü Anluochen, Khan (553–554)
Yujiulü Dengshuzi, Khan (555)

First Turkic Khaganate (complete list) –
Bumin, Qaghan (551–552)
Issik, Qaghan (552–553)
Muqan, Qaghan (554–572)
Taspar, Qaghan (572–581)
Ashina Anluo, Qaghan (581–c.582)
Ishbara, Qaghan (581–587)
Bagha, Qaghan (587–589)
Tulan, Qaghan (588–599)

Tibet (Yarlung Valley) (complete list) –
Drongnyen Deu, King (?)
Tagbu Nyasig, King (579–619)

Gaochang
Mǎ Rú, ruler (496-501)
Qú Jiā, ruler (501-525)
Qú Guāng, ruler (525-530)
Qú Jiān, ruler (530-548)
Qú Xuánxǐ, ruler (549-550)
unnamed son of Qu Xuanxi, ruler (551-554)
Qú Bǎomào, ruler (555-560)
Qú Qiángù, ruler (560-601)

Asia: East

China: Northern dynasties

Northern Wei (complete list) –
Xuanwu, Emperor (499–515)
Xiaoming, Emperor (516–528)
daughter of Xiaoming, Emperor (528)
Yuan Zhao, "Emperor" (528)
Xiaozhuang, Emperor (528–530)
Yuan Ye, Emperor (530–531)
Jiemin, Emperor (531–532)
Yuan Lang, Emperor (531–532)
Xiaowu, Emperor (532–535)

Western Wei (complete list) –
Wen, Emperor (535–551)
Fei, Emperor (552–554)
Gong, Emperor (554–556)

Northern Zhou (complete list) –
Xiaomin, Emperor (557)
Ming, Emperor (557–560)
Wu, Emperor (561–578)
Jing, Emperor (579–581)

Eastern Wei (complete list) –
Xiaojing, Emperor (534–550)

Northern Qi (complete list) –
Wenxuan, Emperor (550–559)
Fei, Emperor (560)
Xiaozhao, Emperor (560–561)
Wucheng, Emperor (561–565)
Gao Wei, Emperor (565–577)
Gao Heng, Emperor (577)

China: Southern dynasties

Southern Qi (complete list) –
Xiao Baojuan, Emperor (499–501)
He, Emperor (501–502)

Southern Liang (complete list) –
Wu, Emperor (502–549)
Jianwen, Emperor (549–551)
Xiao Dong, Prince (551–552)
Yuan, Emperor (552–555)
Xiao Yuanming, Marquess (555)
Jing, Emperor (555–557)

Western Liang (complete list) –
Xuan, Emperor (555–562)
Ming, Emperor (562–585)
Jing, Emperor (585–587)

Southern Chen (complete list) –
Wu, Emperor (557–559)
Wen, Emperor (560–566)
Xuan, Emperor (569–582)
Chen Shubao, Emperor/Duke (582–589)

China: Sui dynasty

Sui dynasty (complete list) –
Wen, Emperor (581–604)

Japan
Japan, Asuka period (complete list) –
Buretsu, Emperor (498–506)
Keitai, Emperor (507–531)
Ankan, Emperor (531–535)
Senka, Emperor (535–539)
Kinmei, Emperor (539–571)
Bidatsu, Emperor (572–585)
Yōmei, Emperor (585–587)
Sushun, Emperor (587–592)
Suiko, Empress (592–628)

Korea
Baekje (complete list) –
Dongseong, King (479–501)
Muryeong, King (501–523)
Seong, King (523–554)
Wideok, King (554–598)
Hye, King (598–599)
Beop, King (599–600)
Mu, King (600–641)

Geumgwan Gaya (complete list) –
Gyeomji, King (492–521)
Guhyeong, King (521–532)

Goguryeo (complete list) –
Munja, King (491–519)
Anjang, King (519–531)
An-won, King (531–545)
Yang-won, King (545–559)
Pyeong-won, King (559–590)
Yeong-yang, King (590–618)

Silla (complete list) –
Jijeung, King (500–514)
Beopheung, King (514–540)
Jinheung, King (540–576)
Jinji, King (576–579)
Jinpyeong, King (579–632)

Asia: Southeast

Cambodia

Funan (complete list) –
Qiáochénrú Shéyébámó, King (484–514)
Rudravarman, King (514–c.545)

Chenla (complete list) –
Bhavavarman I, King (c.550-590)
Mohendravarman, King (c.590–611)

Indonesia
Indonesia: Java
Tarumanagara (complete list) –
Indrawarman, King (455–515)
Candrawarman, King (515–535)
Suryawarman, King (535–561)
Kertawarman, King (561–628)

Indonesia: Sumatra
Kantoli –
Vijayavarman, King (c.519)

Malaysia: Peninsular
Kedah Sultanate (complete list) –
Karna DiMaharaja, Maharaja (c.465–512)
Karma, Maharaja (c.512–580)
Maha Dewa II, Maharaja (c.580–620)

Vietnam

Champa (complete list) –
Fan Wenkuan, King (c.502–c.510)
Devavarman, King (c.510–c.526)
Vijayavarman, King (c.526–c.529)
Rudravarman I, King (c.529)
Sambuvarman, King (mid 6th century)

Early Lý dynasty (complete list) –
Lý Nam Đế, Emperor (544–548)
Triệu Việt Vương, Emperor (548–571)
Đào Lang Vương, Emperor (549–555)
Hậu Lý Nam Đế, Emperor (571–603)

Asia: South

Bengal and Northeast India

Gauda Kingdom (complete list) –
Shashanka, King (c.590–625)

Kamarupa: Varman dynasty (complete list) –
Narayanavarman, King (494–518)
Bhutivarman, King (518–542)
Chandramukhavarman, King (542–566)
Sthitavarman, King (566–590)
Susthitavarman, King (590–595)
Supratisthitavarman, King (595–600)
Bhaskaravarman, King (600–650)

India

Chahamanas of Shakambhari (complete list) –
Vasu-deva, King (6th century)

Chalukya dynasty (complete list) –
Jayasimha, King (c.500–c.520)
Ranaraga, King (c.520–c.540)
Pulakeshin I, King (c.540–c.567)
Kirttivarman I, King (c.567–c.592)
Mangalesha, King (c.592–c.610)

Eastern Ganga dynasty (complete list) –
Indravarman I, King (496–535)
Samantavarman, King (537–562)
Hastivarman, King (562–578)
Indravarman II, King (578–589)
Danarnava, King (589–652)
Indravarman III, King (589–652)

Western Ganga dynasty (complete list) –
Avinita, King (469–529) 
Durvinita, King (529–579)
Mushkara, King (579–604)

Gupta Empire (complete list) –
Narasimhagupta Baladitya, Emperor (c.495–?)
Kumaragupta III, Emperor
Vishnugupta, Emperor (c.540–c.550)
Vainyagupta, Emperor (c.551–c.554)
Bhanugupta, Emperor (c.510–?)

Kadamba dynasty: Banavasi branch (complete list) –
Ravivarma, Maharaja (485–519)
Harivarma, Maharaja (519–530)

Kadamba dynasty: Triparvatha branch (complete list) –
Simhavarma, Maharaja (485–516)
Krishna Varma II, Maharaja (516–540)

Maitraka dynasty (complete list) –
Dronasinha, Maharaja (c.500–c.520)
Dhruvasena I, Maharaja (c.520–c.550)
Dharapatta, Maharaja (c.550–c.556)
Gruhasena, Maharaja(dhiraja) (c.556–c.570)
Dharasena II, Maharaja (c.570–c.595)
Śīlāditya I, Maharaja (c.595–c.615)

Maukhari dynasty (complete list) –
Ishana-varman, King (c.550–560)
Sharva-varman, King (c.560–575)
Avanti-varman, King (c.575–600)
Graha-varman, King (c.600–605)

Pallava dynasty –
The Pallava dynasty has two chronologies of rulers.
Nandivarman I, King (480–500/510)
Kumaravishnu II, King (early 6th century)
Buddhavarman, King (early 6th century)
Kumaravishnu III, King (early 6th century)
Simhavarman III, King (early/mid 6th century)
Simhavishnu, King (mid/late 6th century)
Mahendravarman I, King (6th/7th century)

Pandyan dynasty (complete list) –
Kadungon, King (590–620)

Pushyabhuti dynasty (complete list) –
Naravardhana, King (c.500–525)
Rajyavardana, King (c.525–555)
Adityavardhana, King (c.555–580)
Prabhakara-vardhana, King (c.580–605)

Vishnukundina dynasty (complete list) –
Vikramendra Varma I, Maharaja (c.508–528)
Vikramendra Varma II, Maharaja (555–569)
Janssraya Madhava Varma IV, Maharaja (573–621)

Sri Lanka

Anuradhapura Kingdom, Sri Lanka (complete list) –
Moggallana I, King (497–515)
Kumara Dhatusena, King (515–524)
Kittisena, King (524–524)
Siva II, King (524–525)
Upatissa II, King (525–526)
Silakala Ambosamanera, King (526–539)
Dathappabhuti, King (539–540)
Moggallana II, King (540–560)
Kittisiri Meghavanna, King (560–561)
Maha Naga, King (561–564)
Aggabodhi I, King (564–598)
Aggabodhi II, King (598–608)

Asia: West

Turks

Western Turkic Khaganate (complete list) –
Istämi, Yabgu (553–575)
Tardu
Yabgu (575–581)
Qaghan (581–603)
Apa, Qaghan of the Apa line (581–587)
Niri, Qaghan of the Apa line (c.600)

Persia

Persia: Sasanian Empire (complete list) –
Kavadh I, Shahanshah, King of Kings (498–496, 499–531)
Khosrow I, Shahanshah, King of Kings (531–579)
Hormizd IV, Shahanshah, King of Kings (579–590)
Khosrow II, Shahanshah, King of Kings (590)
Bahram VI Chobin,§ Shahanshah, King of Kings (590–591)
Khosrow II, Shahanshah, King of Kings (591–628)
Vistahm,§ Shahanshah, King of Kings (591–596)

Europe

Europe: Balkans
Byzantine Empire (complete list) –
Anastasius I, Emperor (491–518)
Justin I, Emperor (518–527)
Justinian I, Emperor (527–565)
Justin II, Emperor (565–578)
Tiberius II, Emperor (578–582)
Maurice, Emperor (582–602) 
Theodosius, Co-Emperor (590–602)

Europe: British Isles

Great Britain: Scotland

Dál Riata (complete list) –
Loarn, King (474–500)
Fergus Mór, King (500–501)
Domangart Réti, King (?–c.507)
Comgall mac Domangairt, King (?–c.540)
Gabrán mac Domangairt, King (?–c.560)
Conall mac Comgaill, King (?–c.574)
Áedán mac Gabráin, King (?–c.606)

Picts (complete list) –
Galam Cennalath, King (550–555)
Bridei I, King (554–584)
Gartnait II, King (584–595)
Nechtan nepos Uerb, King (595–616)

Kingdom of Strathclyde / Alt Clut (complete list) –
Dyfnwal Hen, King (early 6th century)
Clinoch of Alt Clut, King (6th century)
Tutagual, King (mid 6th century)
Rhydderch Hael, King (6th–7th century)

Isle of Man (complete list) –
, King (c.550)
, King (c.575)

Great Britain: Northumbria

Bernicia (complete list) –
Ida, King (c.547–559)
Glappa, King (559–560)
Adda, King of Bernicia (560–568)
Aethelric, King (568–572)
Theodric, King (572–579)
Frithuwald, King (579–585)
Hussa, King (585–592)
Æthelfrith, King (593–616)

Deira (complete list) –
Ælla, King (560–589)
Aethelric, King (589–604)

Great Britain: England

The Britons (complete list) –
Ambrosius Aurelianus, Leader (late 5th century)
Maelgwn Gwynedd, King (?–c.549)
Selyf ap Cynan, King (?–c.613)

Dumnonia (complete list) –
Geraint, King (c.480–c.514)
Cador, King (c.514–c.530)
Constantine, King (c.530–c.560)
Gerren rac Denau, King (c.560–c.598)
Bledric ap Custennin, King (c.598–c.613)

Kingdom of East Anglia (complete list) –
Wehha, King (?–571)
Wuffa of East Anglia, King (571–578)
Tytila of East Anglia, King (578–593)
Raedwald of East Anglia, King (593–624)

Kingdom of Essex (complete list) –
Æscwine, King (527–587)
Sledd, King (587–604)

Kingdom of Kent (complete list) –
Oisc, King (488–c.512)
Octa, King (512/516–534/540)
Eormenric, King (534/540–c.590)
Æthelberht I, King (c.590–616)

Kingdom of Sussex (complete list) –
Ælle, King (477–514)
Cissa, King (514–567)

Kingdom of Wessex (complete list) –
Cerdic, King (519–534)
Cynric, King (534–560)
Ceawlin, King (560–592)
Cynric, King (534–560)
Ceol, King (591–597)
Ceolwulf, King (597–611)

Great Britain: Wales

Kingdom of Ceredigion –
, King (490–523)
, King (523–560)
Arthfoddw ap Boddw, King (560–595)
Arthlwys ap Arthwfoddw, King (595–630)

Kingdom of Glywysing (complete list) –
Cadoc, ruler of Gwynllwg (523–580) ruler of Penychen (540–580)

Kingdom of Gwynedd (complete list) –
Cadwallon Lawhir ap Einion, King (c.500–534)
Maelgwn Gwynedd, King (c.520–c.547)
Rhun Hir ap Maelgwn, King (c.547–c.580)
Beli ap Rhun, King (c.580–c.599)
Iago ap Beli, King (c.599–c.616)

Kingdom of Gwent (complete list) –
Meurig ap Tewdrig, King (493/517–530–540)

Kingdom of Powys (complete list) –
Cyngen Glodrydd, King (c.500)
Pasgen ap Cyngen, King (c.530)
Morgan ap Pasgen, King (c.540)
Brochwel Ysgithrog, King (c.550)
Cynan Garwyn, King (582–610)

Ireland

Ireland (complete list) –
These kings are generally though historical, but dates are uncertain and naming some High Kings may be anachronistic or inaccurate.
Lugaid mac Lóegairi, High King (479–503)
Muirchertach mac Ercae, High King (504–527)
Túathal Máelgarb, High King (528–538
Diarmait mac Cerbaill, High King (539–558)
Domhnall and Fearghus, High Kings (559–561)
Eochaidh and Baedan, High Kings (562–563)
Ainmuire mac Sétnai, High King (564–566)
Báetán mac Ninnedo, High King (567)
Áed mac Ainmuirech, High King (568–594)
Áed Sláine and Colmán Rímid, High King (595–600)

Airgíalla (complete list) –
Colga mac Loite mac Cruinn, King (?–513)
Cairpre Daim Argat, King (?–514)
Daimine Daim Argat, King (?–565)
Conall Derg mac Daimine)
Bec mac Cuanu, King (?–594)
Aed mac Colgan, King (?–606)

Europe: Central

Duchy of Alsace (see also) –
Butilin, Duke (539–554)
Leuthari I, Duke (pre-552–554)
Haming, Duke (539–554)
Lantachar, Duke (?–548)
Magnachar, Duke (555–565)
Vaefar, Duke (565–573)
Theodefrid, Duke (fl.573)
Leutfred, Duke (570–587)
Uncilin, Duke (587–607)

Bavaria (complete list) –
Garibald I, Duke (555–591)
Tassilo I, Duke (591–610)

Old Saxony (complete list) –
Hadugato, Duke (fl.531)

Thuringia (complete list) –
Baderich, King (500–530)
Berthachar, King (500–530)
Herminafried, King (500–531)

Europe: East
Avar Khaganate –
Kandik, Khagan (554–562)
Bayan I, Khagan (562–602)

Kingdom of the Gepids
, fl. 488
, fl. 505
Elemund, ?–548
Thurisind, 548–c.560
Cunimund, c.560–567

Europe: Nordic
Sweden (complete list) –
Ongentheow, King (c.490–515)
Ohthere, King
Onela, King
Eadgils, King (c.530–575)
Östen, King (late 6th century) 
Sölve, King (late 6th–early 7th century)

Europe: Southcentral

Lombards in Pannonia (complete list) –
Tato, King (c.500–510)
Wacho, King (510–539)
Walthari, King (539–546)
Audoin, King (546–560)
Alboin, King (560–568)

Kingdom of the Lombards in Italy (complete list) –
Alboin, King (568–572)
Cleph, King (572–574)
Rule of the Dukes (574–584)
Authari, King (584–590)
Agilulf, King (590–616)

Kingdom of the Ostrogoths in Italy (complete list) –
Theodoric, King (493–526)
Athalaric, King (526–534)
Theodahad, King (534–536)
Vitiges, King (536–540)
Ildibad, King (540–541)
Eraric, King (541)
Totila, King (541–552)
Teia, King (552–553)

Duchy of Spoleto (complete list) –
Faroald I, Duke (570–592)
Ariulf, Duke (592–602)

Europe: Southwest

Kingdom of Galicia / Kingdom of the Suebi (complete list) –
Veremund, King (fl. 535)
Theodemund, King (fl. 6th century)
Chararic, King (c.550–558/559)
Ariamir, King (558/559–561/566)
Theodemar, King (561/566–570)
Miro, King (570–583)
Eboric, King (583–584)
Andeca, King (584–585)
Malaric, King (585)

Visigothic Kingdom (complete list) –
Alaric II, King (484–507)
Gesalec, King (507–511)
Theoderic the Great, Regent (511–526)
Amalaric, King (526–531)
Theudis, King (531–548)
Theudigisel, King (548–549)
Agila I, King (549–554)
Athanagild, King (554–568)
Liuva I, King (568–572)
Liuvigild, King (569–586)
Hermenegild, King (580–585)
Reccared I, King (580–601)
Segga, King (586–587)
Argimund, King (589–590)

Europe: West

Austrasia of the Franks (complete list) – 
Theuderic I, King (511–533)
Theudebert I, King (533–548)
Theudebald, King (548–555)
Chlothar I, King (555–561)
Sigebert I, King (561–575)
Childebert II, King (575–595)
Theudebert II, King (595–612)

Kingdom of the Burgundians (non-Merovingian) (complete list) –
Gundobad, King in Lyon and Burgundy (473–516)
Godegisel, King in Vienne and Geneva (473–500)
Sigismund, King (516–523)
Godomar, King (523–532)

Kingdom of Burgundy (Merovingian) (complete list) - 
Guntram, King (561–592)
Childebert II, King (592–595), also King of Austrasia
Theuderic II, King (595–613), also King of Austrasia

Champagne (complete list) –
, Duke (570s)

Frankish Empire: Merovingian dynasty (complete list) –
Clovis I, King (481–511)
Childebert I, King (511–558)
Chlodomer, King (511–524)
Theuderic I, King (511–533)
Theudebert I, King (533–548)
Theudebald, King (548–555)
Chlothar I, King (511–561)
Charibert I, King (561–567)
Guntram, King (561–592)
Sigebert I, King (561–575)
Childebert II, King (575–595)
Theudebert II, King (595–612)

Eurasia: Caucasus

Kingdom of Abkhazia (complete list) –
Anos, King (c.510–530)
Ghozar, King (c.530–550)
Istvine, King (c.550–580)
Phinictios, King (c.580–610)

Kingdom of Iberia (Kartli) (complete list) –
Vakhtang I Gorgasali, King (447–522)
Dachi, King (522–534)
Bacurius II, King (534–547)
Pharasmanes V, King (547–561)
Pharasmanes VI, King (561–?)
Bacurius III, King (?–580)

See also

References 

Leaders
 
-